Abraham ben Judah Leib (Löb) Maskileison (Hebrew: אברהם משכיל לאיתן); (b.1788– d.1848) was  a Jewish scholar, rabbi and author active in Russia during the first half of the 19th century.

Rabbi Maskileison was a great-grandson of another Talmudic scholar, Rabbi Israel ben Aaron Jaffe of Shklov (1640–1702), author of Or Yisrael. Born in Radoshkovichy, Maskileison studied under his father Yehuda (Judah) Leib Jaffe (1723–1783), who was av beit din of Khotimsk in Mogilev. His designation and family name Maskileison takes its name from the Ashkenazi pronunciation of the title (from Ps. 88:1) of his book Maskil le-Eitan. Maskileison discharged his rabbinical duties in many cities, serving as av beit din in Novogrudok. He later moved to Minsk, where he lived until his death at the age of about 60. Having no desire to use his cabalistic knowledge for gain, as was done by the miracle-working rabbis, he devoted his whole life to study of the Torah and the Talmud. He lived in comparative poverty, being satisfied with only a small income.

Works
Abraham Maskileison wrote the following works:
Maskil le-Eisan (1818). Shklov. Novellae to the Talmudic tractates of orders Moed and Kodoshim, printed with the approbations of Saul Katzenellenbogen of Vilno and Manasseh Iliyer.
Be'er Avraham (1848). Vilno. Novellae to Talmudic tractate Berakhot and the order Moed.

Abraham Maskileison's posthumously published works were:
Nachal Eisan (1855). Vilno.
Mitzpeh Eisan (1858–64). Zhitomir; (1880–86). Vilno. Novellae and glosses to tractates of the Talmud.
Yad Abraham (1888). Vilno. Novellae on Yoreh De'ah; His notes on Sifre were published in Solomon Luria's edition (1866).
Ahavas Eisan (1883–84), Comments and novellae on Ein Yaakov.
Yad Eisan (1900).

Family 
Abraham Maskileison was the son of Chaya and Rabbi Yehuda Leib ben Abraham Jaffe. He married Chana (Hanna) Dina, daughter of Aryeh Leib, a scholar and merchant.

His sons included Aaron, Kalman, Yehuda Leib, Naphtali and Moses Nisan.

 Aaron Maskileison published his father's books. Some of his thoughts on the Torah are printed at the end of his father's book Be'er Avraham, which he published. Aaron's son Abraham Isaac Maskileison (1840–1905) authored two handwritten books Zera Eisan and Neharot Eisan but the manuscripts were lost. Reuven Katz (1880–1963), the chief rabbi of Petah Tikvah, was his son-in-law through Abraham's daughter Rachel.
 Kalman Kalonymus (Klementyi), a merchant, assisted financially in the publication of his father's book Be'er Avraham. His son Nissan (Nikolai) became a tsar-appointed doctor in 1895.
 Yehuda Leib served as a rabbi in the city of Plieščanicy, Minsk region.
 Naphtali (1829–1897). His main work is his rearranged and republished critical edition, with his own footnotes, of the Seder ha-Dorot (1877–82) of Rabbi Jehiel Heilprin (1660–1746).
 Moses Nisan (1835–1878) was av beit din of the community of Shumyachi and author of the Ḥikkrei Halakhot (1875 Vilno).

References

Fuenn, Keneset Yisrael, p. 41
Eisenstadt-Ben Zion, Rabbane Minsk, pp. 27–43
Benjacob, Oẓar ha-Sefarim, pp. 132, 133, 376, 395; preface (by Abraham Maskileison's son) to Naḥal Etan

1788 births
1848 deaths
Russian rabbis
Kabbalists
Jewish writers